Kyaw is a town in Gangaw Township, Pakokku District (Gangaw District), in the north-western part of the Magway Region in Myanmar.  It lies on the left (eastern) bank of the Kyaw River.

Transport
The railway from Pakokku to the Myittha River valley runs past Kyaw.

Notes

External links
 "Kyaw Map — Satellite Images of Kyaw" Maplandia
d

Populated places in Magway Region